The 2012 season was the Puerto Rico Islanders ninth season over all and their second season in the North American Soccer League. This article shows player statistics and all matches that the club have and will play during the 2012 season.

Club

Technical Staff

Kit

Squad

First Team Squad
As of September 16, 2012.

Transfers

In

Out

Match results

North American Soccer League

NASL Playoffs

CFU Club Championship

Group 4

Matches played at the Cayman Islands (host club: George Town).

 Baltimore withdrew due to being unable to obtain visas to enter the Cayman Islands.

Final round
In the semifinals, the two second-round group winners play against the runners-up from the opposite group. The semifinal winners play in the final while the losers play in the third place match.

Matches played at Trinidad and Tobago.

Semifinals

Third place match

The champion, runner-up, and third place qualify for the Group Stage of the 2012–13 CONCACAF Champions League.

CONCACAF Champions League

Group 5

Squad statistics

Goal scorers

References

2012
American soccer clubs 2012 season
2012 North American Soccer League season
Islanders